de Vaucouleurs's law, also known as the de Vaucouleurs profile or de Vaucouleurs model, describes how the surface brightness  of an elliptical galaxy varies as a function of apparent distance  from the center of the galaxy:

By defining Re as the radius of the isophote containing half of the total luminosity of the galaxy, the half-light radius, de Vaucouleurs profile may be expressed as:

or

where Ie is the surface brightness at Re. This can be confirmed by noting

de Vaucouleurs model is a special case of Sersic's model, with a Sersic index of n=4.  A number of (internal) density profiles that approximately reproduce de Vaucouleurs's law after projection onto the plane of the sky include Jaffe's model and Dehnen's model.

The model is named after Gérard de Vaucouleurs who first formulated it in 1948.  Although an empirical model rather than a law of physics, it was so entrenched in astronomy during the 20th century that it was referred to as a "law".

References

External links
 Eric Weisstein's World of Astronomy entry

Astrophysics